Code Name: Emperor (also known under the working title ) is a 2022 political thriller and spy  film directed by Jorge Coira and written by Jorge Guerricaechevarría. The cast, led by Luis Tosar, also features Alexandra Masangkay, Georgina Amorós, Denis Gómez, Miguel Rellán and Arón Piper, among others.

It is about an intelligence agency operative who faces ethical challenges when he is told to lure a newly elected congressman into a honey trap with an underage teenage girl.

Plot
Juan is a middle-aged Spanish intelligence agency operative who leads a small team that includes a male hacker and a female operative with a range of skills. He juggles tracking a wealthy couple who are involved in meetings with a neo-Nazi leader and a weapons trafficker and surveillance of a young congressman. 

To gain access to the weapons trafficking couple's mansion, Juan and his team stage a kidnapping of the couple's live-in Filipino maid, Wendy, and they make it seem as if Juan is another kidnapping victim. The team throw the pair out of the vehicle at a stop. This set-up gives Juan the opportunity to meet Wendy. He romances her, which gives him access to the mansion so he can install hidden cameras.

As the surveillance of the weapons traffickers continues, Juan continues to meet with Wendy to gain access to the house. His team discovers evidence that the couple are planning to bring black market Cobalt-60 into Spain, which may be part of a dirty bomb plot.

Even though Juan is using his sexual relationship with Wendy as part of the surveillance operation, he starts to become emotionally attached to her. She tells him of her dream of saving enough from her work as a maid to return to the Philippines and open a bed and breakfast hotel with her sisters.

Juan's boss, a career-driven, politically-connected officer named Galan, assigns Juan to look into the life of newly-elected congressman Ángel González for illegal or unethical conduct. When Juan's team does hacking and video surveillance and it does not reveal any improprieties, Galan instructs Juan to lure the politician into a compromising situation. 

Juan pressures Marta, a teenage girl he knows from a previous case, to participate in a honey trapping set-up. She sends flirtatious messages to Angel on a dating site. She meets Angel for drinks at a fancy nightclub and then plays it coy. Juan contrives a seeming "chance encounter" with her when Angel is on a work trip. She goes back to Angel's hotel room (in which Juan has had a video camera installed). After they have sex, she goes into the bathroom and smashes her nose into the sink, and then flees into the hall. 

Juan confronts Angel and tells him that he has just had sex with a minor and assaulted her. Marta feels sickened by her participation in the setup, and she smashes Juan's surveillance-cam laptop and flees. Juan finds the distraught teen at her apartment and retrieves his laptop. Despite the damage, the sex recording is intact.

Meanwhile, as the weapons trafficking case develops, Wendy discovers that Juan has been using her to get access to the house and she is upset at his deception. After Juan and his team track the Cobalt-60 shipment and arrest the smugglers, police arrest the weapons trafficking couple, but Wendy was out of the house. He asks her to stay at his apartment until she can resettle. Reluctantly, she agrees. 

When police arrest Wendy and threaten to deport her, Juan provides information to Galan, who explains that the intelligence service tries to ensure that they have compromising information on all politicians, to help the government to control leaders. Galan promises that Wendy will be released. Juan gets her travel documents and a ticket to the Philippines so she can flee. He gives a hard disk of his surveillance operations to a reporter and tells her to blow the whistle on the intelligence agency's unethical and illegal practices. He then abandons his old life to join Wendy in the Philippines.

Cast

Production 

In April 2021, Vaca Films reported the beginning of filming in Madrid. Other shooting locations included Bilbao, A Coruña, Budapest and Panama City.

Release 
The film was presented on 18 March 2022, opening the 25th Málaga Film Festival. Domestically distributed by A Contracorriente Films, it was theatrically released in Spain on the same day. Netflix acquired the distribution rights elsewhere.

Reception 
Jonathan Holland of ScreenDaily described the film as a "a high-speed, intense, and slickly packaged ride through the dark and nasty tunnels of state power".

Accolades 

|-
| rowspan = "8" align = "center" | 2023 || rowspan = "8" | 21st Mestre Mateo Awards || colspan = "2" | Best Film ||  || rowspan = "8" | 
|-
| Best Director || Jorge Coira ||  
|-
| Best Actor || Luis Tosar || 
|-
| Best Supporting Actor || Denís Gómez || 
|-
| Best Production Supervision || María Liaño || 
|-
| Best Original Score || Xavi Font, Elba Fernández || 
|-
| Best Makeup and Hairstyles || Susana Veira, Beatriz Antelo || 
|-
| Best Sound || Carlos Mouriño, Diego Staub, Yasmina Praderas || 
|}

See also 
 List of Spanish films of 2022

References

External links 
 
 Código Emperador at ICAA's Catálogo de Cinespañol

2022 films
2020s political thriller films
2020s spy thriller films
Spanish spy thriller films
Films set in Spain
Films shot in Galicia (Spain)
Films shot in Madrid
Films shot in Budapest
Films shot in Panama
Spanish political thriller films
Films shot in Bilbao
Vaca Films films
2022 thriller films
2020s Spanish-language films
2020s Spanish films